Hare Bay (2021 Population 925) is a Canadian town on Newfoundland's Route 320 in the province of Newfoundland and Labrador. It is in Division No. 7 on Bonavista Bay.

Demographics 

References

 Hare Bay – Encyclopedia of Newfoundland and Labrador, vol. 2, p. 830–833.

Populated coastal places in Canada
Towns in Newfoundland and Labrador